Snails in the Rain ( Shablulim BaGeshem) is a 2013 Israeli drama film. Set in the 1980s, the film revolves around Boaz, a student, who receives love letters from an unknown man, which undermines his sexual identity and threatens his stable relationship with his girlfriend.

Production

Casting
Snails in the Rain was directed by Yariv Mozer. To better understand the challenges facing actors, he decided to act in the film himself, taking on the role of Professor Richlin. He studied under acting coach Ruth Dytches in preparation for this role. Mozer explained, "I chose him [Prof. Richlin] because his story is more like my own. I felt more like him and could identify with him."

Filming
Citing Tom Ford's A Single Man as inspiration, Mozer and cinematographer Shahar Reznik opted to film in a documentary style with the Sony F3, an older camera known for its Super 35 sensor and excellent treatment of highlights and aliasing. Mozer and Reznik sought to use light and color in an authentic yet vintage look.

Central Theme
Snails in the Rain has a gay-themed backdrop which is based on a short story. "I was moved by the story," recalled Mozer. "It was very unusual to find gay literature in Tel Aviv. In fact, in some places it is still very much controversial."

Availability 
As of late 2022, this film is available (at least from the US) on DVD from Amazon, as well as by streaming on Tubi.

Gay Content 
This film has been selected for multiple LBGT film festivals, while it contains homophobic themes:
<li> The poor handsome man isn't responsible for using the phrase, "no, thank you," or for raping his girlfriend in anger.  He's a victim of the gays.
<li>The middle aged gay man is inevitably destined to be miserable and lonely, as well as unethical in his pursuit of love.
<li>If you don't live a straight life, you cannot have children.
It is unclear whether these are intended to be presented as false stereotypes, since there are no further clues in the film.  The protagonist is shown enjoying exclusively heterosexual sex.

References

External links

2013 LGBT-related films
2013 films
Israeli drama films
2013 drama films
LGBT-related drama films
Gay-related films